Jill Golick (born 1956 in Montreal, Quebec) is a Canadian screenwriter, story editor, digital creator and blogger.

Education
Golick attended Brown University in Providence, Rhode Island, and is a graduate of the Canadian Film Centre. She lives and works in Toronto.

Career
Golick writes primarily for convergent or cross-platform media. Early in her career she worked on many Canadian children's programs. More recently, she has written dramas and comedies aimed at prime time.  She has also written for three soap operas including the Canadian night time soap, Metropia, on which she served as Head Writer and Executive Story Editor.

The highlight of Golick's career was writing a couple of episodes of Wizadora.

New media steps

In the wake of the 2007–2008 Writers Guild of America strike, Golick became one of the first Canadian screenwriters to experiment in online storytelling. Her first effort, boymeetsgrrl, told the tale of a dating couple, Simon Beals and Ali Barret. Simon and Ali's romance was explored through Facebook wall messages and status updates, Twitter tweets, blog entries and video blog segments.

Controversy erupted when Golick presented her findings to a Casecamp conference in 2008.  Several people in the audience, upon realizing that they'd been "friended" by Golick's digital avatars, complained to Facebook and had the profiles deleted. Afterward, Golick agreed that there seemed to be a disconnect between the marketers and the creative storytellers about what constituted a "proper use of the medium." "One of the things that so interesting about this little flurry around boymeetgrrl! is that people aren’t upset at sneaky underhanded sales tactics," Golick wrote on a now deleted blogpost for Story2.OH. "They’re not all upset that I was trying to sell them something. They’re angry because art infiltrated their lives. They got swept up into a story and didn’t realize till later that these were characters and not real people. The characters didn’t do anything to them, they weren’t evil or malicious. They just tried to be friendly, funny and entertaining."

Golick continues to develop new online projects through Story2.OH, including the award winning digital detective series for tweens, Ruby Skye PI (Web Series).

Golick maintains a blog, Running With My Eyes Closed, on television writing and is currently the president of the Writers Guild of Canada.  She teaches television writing and transmedia at York University in Toronto, Ontario.

Selected TVography
 The Smoggies
 Chicken Minute
 Eric's World
 Shining Time Station
 Kratt's Creatures
 Wimzie's House
 Magic Adventures of Mumfie
 Zoboomafoo
 Blue Murder
 Metropia
 Instant Star
 Rotten Ralph
 Noddy
 Ripley's Believe It or Not!
 The Busy World of Richard Scarry
 Foreign Affairs
 Zoboomafoo
 Skinnamarink TV

References

External links
 
 Running With My Eyes Closed, Golick's blog
 Story2Oh, Golick's online storytelling site

1956 births
Living people
Anglophone Quebec people
Canadian bloggers
Canadian soap opera writers
Women soap opera writers
Writers from Montreal
Canadian women screenwriters
Canadian television writers
Canadian Film Centre alumni
20th-century Canadian women writers
20th-century Canadian non-fiction writers
Canadian women bloggers
Canadian women television writers